After the Fire may refer to:
 After the Fire, a British rock band
 After the Fire (album), a 1988 album by British white power skinhead band Skrewdriver
 "After the Fire" (Modern Family), the eighth episode of the third season of the American sitcom Modern Family
 "After the Fire" (song), a 1985 song from the solo album Under a Raging Moon by Roger Daltrey
 After the Fire, A Still Small Voice, a 2009 novel by English-Australian author Evie Wild

 "After the Fire" (novel), a book by Swedish author Henning Mankell